The Mapu a Vaea or "Whistle of the Noble" are natural blowholes on the island of Tongatapu in the village of Houma in the Kingdom of Tonga. When waves crash into the reef, natural channels in the volcanic rock allow water to forcefully blow through and create a plume-like effect. It is one of the highlights of the tours around the island of Tongatapu. "Vaea" is the name of the Honorable Vaea Family of nearby Houma.

References

Landforms of Tonga
Blowholes
Tongatapu
Landforms of Oceania